This article is about the particular significance of the year 1723 to Wales and its people.

Incumbents
Lord Lieutenant of North Wales (Lord Lieutenant of Anglesey, Caernarvonshire, Denbighshire, Flintshire, Merionethshire, Montgomeryshire) – Hugh Cholmondeley, 1st Earl of Cholmondeley 
Lord Lieutenant of Glamorgan – vacant until 1729
Lord Lieutenant of Brecknockshire and Lord Lieutenant of Monmouthshire – Sir William Morgan of Tredegar
Lord Lieutenant of Cardiganshire – John Vaughan, 2nd Viscount Lisburne
Lord Lieutenant of Carmarthenshire – vacant until 1755 
Lord Lieutenant of Pembrokeshire – Sir Arthur Owen, 3rd Baronet
Lord Lieutenant of Radnorshire – James Brydges, 1st Duke of Chandos

Bishop of Bangor – Richard Reynolds (until 17 June) William Baker (from 11 August)
Bishop of Llandaff – John Tyler
Bishop of St Asaph – John Wynne
Bishop of St Davids – Adam Ottley (until 3 October)

Events
7 May - Lewis Morris arrives in London from Anglesey.
October - Following the death of Adam Ottley, bishop of St Davids, while in office, Richard Smalbroke, Treasurer of Llandaff, is selected as his successor.
date unknown - The roles of Lord Lieutenant of Brecknockshire and Custos Rotulorum of Brecknockshire are merged.

Arts and literature

New books
Henry Rowlands - Mona Antiqua Restaurata
Christmas Samuel - Llun Agrippa

Births
1 January - Goronwy Owen, poet (died 1769) 
23 February - Richard Price, philosopher (died 1791)
5 March - Princess Mary of Wales, daughter of the Prince and Princess of Wales (died 1772)
August - Sir Richard Perryn, judge (died 1803)

Deaths
28 April - Sir John Williams, 2nd Baronet, of Eltham, English-born politician of Welsh parentage, 69
31 May - William Baxter, classical scholar, 72
4 August - William Fleetwood, Bishop of St Asaph 1704-1708, 67
3 October - Adam Ottley, Bishop of St Davids, 68
21 November - Henry Rowlands, antiquary, 68
10 December - Thomas Mansel, 1st Baron Mansel, politician, about 55
28 December - Sir Charles Lloyd, 1st Baronet, of Milfield, politician, 61

References

1720s in Wales